This is a list of ski areas and resorts in North America.

Canada

Greenland (Denmark)
 See footnote

Mexico

Monterreal

United States

References

North America
Ski areas and resorts
Ski areas and resorts
Ski areas and resorts
Skiing in North America